Shelley Elizabeth Taylor (born 1946) is a distinguished professor of psychology at the University of California, Los Angeles. She received her Ph.D. from Yale University, and was formerly on the faculty at Harvard University. A prolific author of books and scholarly journal articles, Taylor has long been a leading figure in two subfields related to her primary discipline of social psychology: social cognition and health psychology. Her books include The Tending Instinct and Social Cognition, the latter by Susan Fiske and Shelley Taylor.

Taylor's professional honors include the Distinguished Scientific Contribution Award from the American Psychological Association (APA; 1996), the William James Fellow Award from the Association for Psychological Science (APS; 2001), and the APA's Lifetime Achievement Award, which she received in August 2010. Taylor was inducted into the United States National Academy of Sciences in 2009. She was elected to the American Philosophical Society in 2018. For 2019 she received the BBVA Foundation Frontiers of Knowledge Award in Social Sciences.

Early life
Taylor was born in 1946 in the small village of Mt. Kisco, New York. She was the only child to her father, a history teacher, and her mother, a former pop and jazz pianist turned piano teacher. Before her father became a history teacher, he was a psychiatric nurse. During World War II, he was ineligible for service because of Polio, so he volunteered with the Society of Friends and built the first mental hospital in Eritrea. She grew up in Chappaqua, New York, about 1 hour north of New York City near the Connecticut border. Taylor attended Horace Greeley High School in Chappaqua. While in high school, one of her history teachers received a grant from the school to study psychology over the summer. When the school year began instead of teaching history, she taught psychology and it was a life changing experience for her and a lot of her classmates.

College
Taylor began classes at Connecticut College in 1964. She enrolled in both history and psychology courses but was leaning more towards history. However, the instructor for her Introductory Psychology Course informed her that her performance in class indicated that she should pursue psychology. When she objected, he responded "You'd be a terrible historian." After that encounter, Taylor became a psychology major. She originally wanted to be a clinician, but after spending a summer with Volunteers in Service to America where she worked with mostly older and heavily medicated Schizophrenic men, she did not feel as though it was satisfying and decided to do research. Her first experiment examined women's evaluations of other women who had chosen to go into careers instead of having traditional family roles. With Sara Kiesler as her advisor, Taylor was interested in attending graduate school at either the University of Rochester to work with Elaine Walster or Yale to work with David Mettee. She eventually decided on Yale.

Graduate school at Yale
At Yale, she briefly worked with Mettee but their interests and personal styles were not a match. She wanted to work with Richard Nisbett but his laboratory was full. She eventually did her dissertation research on attribution theory with John McConahay. Her dissertation focused on Daryl Bem's self-perception theory and addressed whether or not people infer their attitudes from their behavior. She found that false feedback of one's behavior is accepted as a basis for one's attitudes if it is consistent with pre-existing attitudes.

While at Yale, she encountered several other people who would be leaders in psychology in the future, such as Mark Zanna, Michael Storms, Ellen Langer, Carol Dweck, James Cutting, Henry Roediger, and Robert Kraut. A very significant person in Taylor's academic career was Kenneth Keniston, a psychiatrist at the Yale School of Medicine. He typically did not work with psychology graduate students, but after some persuasion, he taught Taylor and some other students about using interviews as a tool to generate and test hypotheses.

Taylor was also influenced by the women's movement of the 1960s. She joined the New Haven Women's Liberation Movement and helped organize demonstrations, sit-ins, protests, and conferences. She was arrested once for storming Mory's, a club at Yale that originally was only open to men. Within months, the policy was changed and women were allowed. She received her doctorate in social psychology from Yale in 1972. While at Yale, Taylor also met her future husband, architect Mervyn Fernandes. After Yale, she received a position at Harvard.

Harvard
After Yale, Taylor and her husband moved to Cambridge and she worked in Harvard's Psychology and Social Relations Department. At this time, she became very interested in social cognition and drew heavily on attribution theory. Taylor was among the first to apply the breakthrough work of Daniel Kahneman and Amos Tversky on heuristics and biases to the field of social psychology (Taylor, 1982).

Social cognition
With an undergraduate by the name of Susan Fiske at Harvard, Taylor began a research program on salience and the effects that salience has on people's inferences. In a famous paper, Taylor and Fiske found that "point of view influences perceptions of causality, such that a person who engulfs your visual field is seen as more impactful in a situation...imagining actions from the perspective of a particular character leads to empathetic inference and recall of information best learned from that person's perspectives." Taylor also did other work on salience with regard to stereotyping and cognitive biases. For example, she found that if a person in your field is a token or solitary member of a group, they are more likely to be viewed in stereotyped role than if the person was a member of the majority group and their identity is much more salient. For example, when people observed a group of men and women having a discussion, the viewers organized their recall around gender, such that when people were likely to incorrectly attribute a comment from one person to another, it was usually mixing up a woman's comment with another woman or mixing up a man's comment with another man (Taylor, 1981).

Taylor also has made contributions to social cognition with her "top of the head phenomena" (Taylor & Fiske, 1978). The top of the head phenomena states that "the more salient an actor is, the more an observer will ascribe a causality to him or her rather than to other less salient actors." For example, in a situation with a clear leader, other actors are focused on the leader and the leader is seen as the cause of an event as opposed to external events or other actors, even when it is not true. It is hypothesized that people focus mostly on the salience of a person to make snap judgments as opposed to truly understanding a given situation (Goethals et al., 2004: pg. 59).

In 1984, Taylor co-authored a book entitled Social Cognition with her former student Susan Fiske. This book became instrumental in defining the scope and ambition of the nascent field of social cognition. A second edition was published in 1991, and a sequel of sorts entitled Social Cognition: From Brains to Culture appeared in 2007. Taylor has also conducted research on social comparison processes and continues to conduct and publish research on social cognition throughout the 1990s and 2000s.

Health psychology
Around 1976, Taylor was contacted by Judy Rodin to do a presentation on a social psychological perspective on breast cancer. At the time, however, there was not any research looking at the links between social psychology and health. So, Taylor and a friend with breast cancer at the time, Smadar Levin, decided to explore the connection between social psychology and what is now known as health psychology. Taylor along with other social psychologists such as Howard Friedman and Christine Dunkel-Schetter were instrumental in the development of health psychology as a specialty. At Harvard, however, it was difficult to pursue health psychology because the medical school was so far from the main campus. Taylor asked the university president at the time, Derek Bok, for some start-up funds to help develop a health psychology program at Harvard. He provided her with a $10,000 dollar check to develop a health psychology interest at Harvard. However, she was passed up for tenure at Harvard and went to the University of California, Los Angeles.

UCLA
In 1979, she joined the faculty at UCLA, where they were very interested in growing health psychology. In 1981, Taylor applied for and received the National Institutes of Health Research Scientist Development Award so that she could receive additional training in disease processes. It was a 10-year award that allowed her to learn biological assessments and methods. With biological psychologist, John Libeskind, Taylor was able to look at stress and its effects on stress regulatory systems.

At this time, she became very interested in understanding the coping processes of women with breast cancer so she began interviewing them and their partners about their experiences. Through intensive interviews, Taylor found that some of the women's beliefs were to a degree, illusions. A lot of the women held unrealistic beliefs about their recovery from cancer and their abilities to rid themselves of the cancer. Her research on these women led to the development of Taylor's theory of cognitive adaptation (Taylor, 1983). Cognitive adaptation states that when someone faces a threatening event, their readjustment centers around finding meaning in their experience, gaining control over the situation, and boosting one's self-esteem. This work clearly informed one of her next big topics, positive illusions.

Positive illusions
In 1988, Taylor and a colleague Jonathon Brown published "Illusion and Well-Being: A Social Psychological Perspective on Mental Health", one of the most cited social psychology papers of all time (Taylor & Brown, 1988). Taylor's research on positive illusions is some of her most influential and well-known work. Taylor has described the use of positive illusions as follows: "Rather than perceiving themselves, the world, and the future accurately, most people regard themselves, their circumstances, and the future as considerably more positive than is objectively likely.... These illusions are not merely characteristic of human thought; they appear actually to be adaptive, promoting rather than undermining good mental health."

Taylor's positive illusion work did elicit a lot of criticism from other social psychologists. For example, Shedler, Mayman, and Manis (1993) reported evidence that positive illusions may not be adaptive. People with overly positive views were actually maladjusted in clinical interviews. Also, people with this "illusory mental health" have stronger biological responses to stressful tasks. This was contradictory to Taylor's findings that showed that cancer patients with more positive illusions had lower mortality rates than those without positive illusions. Taylor then did other studies that showed that people with AIDS who hold positive illusions about their ability to overcome the disease lived longer and were less likely to develop AIDS symptoms over time.

Her research on positive illusions was also influential in her personal life. She says "interviewing those women about the insights that came from their disease, so many said that it makes you realize that relationships are the most important thing you have and that children were the most important thing they did with their lives...I went home and talked with my husband, and we thought about having a child." They later had two children, one daughter and one son.

Social neuroscience
In the mid-1990s, Taylor was participating in the MacArthur Network on Socioeconomic Status and Health and developed an interest in mechanisms linking psychosocial conditions to health outcomes. In another very popular paper with some UCLA colleagues, Rena Repetti and Teresa Seeman, titled "Health psychology: What is an unhealthy environment and how does it get under the skin?," they explored processes by which environments with different stressors such as poverty, violence exposure, threat, and other chronically stressful events lead to differences in health outcomes by socioeconomic status. Taylor greatly drew on Bruce McEwen's concept of allostatic load, the cumulative wear and tear on the body. In subsequent work with Repetti and Seeman, Taylor found that risky family environments predict elevated blood pressure and heart rate and an elevated flat cortisol slope in stressful laboratory tasks. Taylor also has interest in social support and how it relates to biology. She has examined cultural and gender differences in social support and how they affect adjustment to stressful life events. She has also found that people with more psychosocial resources have lesser cardiovascular and hypothalamic-pituitary-adrenal responses to stress. Her interest in social support also influenced her tend-and-befriend model which will be discussed below.

Taylor has become a leading figure in the newly emerging field of social neuroscience. This work has included research using functional magnetic resonance imaging (fMRI), conducted in collaboration with UCLA colleagues Matthew Lieberman and Naomi Eisenberger. In one study, they found that kids from risky families and environments have deficits in emotion regulation in response to stressful circumstance that can be seen at the neural level (Taylor, Eisenberger, Saxbe, Lehman, & Lieberman, 2006). In another, they found that high levels of social support are crucial to attenuating neuroendocrine responses to stress through less activation of particular brain areas such as the dACC and Brodmann's area 8 (Eisenberger, Taylor, Gable, Hillmert, & Lieberman, 2007). They have done more research on the serotonin transporter polymorphism (Taylor, Way et al., 2006) and on plasma oxytocin and vasopressin (Taylor, Gonzaga et al., 2006; Taylor, Saphire-Bernstein & Seeman, 2010).

Tend and befriend model
In 2000, Taylor and colleagues developed the tend and befriend model of responses to stress.  This model contrasts with the "fight-or-flight response" which states that in the face of a harmful stressor, we either face it or run from it. Instead, tend and Befriend evolves from an evolutionary perspective and asserts that "people, especially women, evolved social means for dealing with stress that involved caring for offspring and protecting them from harm and turning to the social group for protection for the self and offspring." Taylor hypothesized that fight or flight would not be as evolutionarily adaptive for women as for men because women typically have young children. Regan Gurung, a colleague of Taylor's and a developer of the theory once stated:

"The 'fight or flight' model is based on the very simple assumption that our bodies prepare us for action to either fight with a foe or to run away from it. However, from an evolutionary standpoint, women evolved as caregivers; applying the same 'fight or flight' model, if women fight and lose, then they are leaving an infant behind. By the same token, if they flee, it's a lot harder to flee if you are carrying an infant and you're not going to leave the infant behind."

So, females may form tight social bonds to seek out friends in times of stress. Research by Taylor and Repetti has found that during times of stress, women typically spend more time tending to vulnerable offspring while men were more likely to withdraw from family life. Oxytocin, a female reproductive hormone typically involved in pair bonding and endorphins, proteins that alleviate pain, are hypothesized to be the biological mechanisms by which we tend and befriend. From this area of research, Taylor wrote "The Tending Instinct: Women, Men, and the Biology of Relationships"

Publications
Note: List is selective and includes only highly cited and important works and works cited above.

Books

Chapters in books

Taylor, S. E. (1981). A categorization approach to stereotyping. In D. L. Hamilton (Ed.) Cognitive processes in stereotyping and intergroup behavior (pp. 83–114). Hillsdale, NJ: Lawrence Erlbaum Associates, Inc.
Taylor, S. E. (1982). The availability bias in social perception and interaction. In D. Kahneman, P. Slovic & A. Tversky (Eds.) Judgment under uncertainty: Heuristics and biases (pp. 190–200). New York: Cambridge University Press.
Taylor, S. E. (2008). From social psychology to neuroscience and back. In R. Levine, A. Rodrigues & L. Zelezny (Eds.) Journeys in Social Psychology: Looking Back to Inspire the Future (pp. 39–54). New York: Psychology Press.
Goethals, G. R., Sorenson, G. J., & Burns, J. M. (Eds.). (2004). Encyclopedia of leadership: AE (Vol. 1). Sage.

Journal articles

References

External links
American Psychological Association winners of Distinguished Scientific Contribution Award
Taylor Lab at UCLA

21st-century American psychologists
American women psychologists
20th-century American psychologists
Social psychologists
Connecticut College alumni
Yale University alumni
Harvard University faculty
University of California, Los Angeles faculty
Members of the United States National Academy of Sciences
People from Chappaqua, New York
1946 births
Living people
Members of the American Philosophical Society
Horace Greeley High School alumni
Corresponding Fellows of the British Academy
American women academics
21st-century American women
Members of the National Academy of Medicine